Serious Business is an album by guitarist and singer Johnny Winter.  It was released in 1985 on vinyl and CD by Alligator Records.

Serious Business was nominated for a Grammy Award for Best Traditional Blues Album.

Critical reception

On AllMusic, William Ruhlmann said, "Signing to the Chicago-based independent blues label Alligator Records, [Winter] staged his own comeback with 1984's Guitar Slinger, and its follow-up, Serious Business, is in the same vein. That vein is straight Chicago-style electric blues in the manner of Muddy Waters....  He was already developing from his old mile-a-minute playing style into more of an expressive bluesman in the late '70s. Here, the transition is complete....  Maybe Johnny Winter isn't trying to be a superstar anymore, but his striving to be a consummate bluesman is wholly successful."

Track listing
"Master Mechanic" (A.D. Prestage, Joe Shamwell, Walter Godbold) – 3:37
"Sound the Bell" (Clarence Garlow, Eddie Shuler) – 3:23
"Murdering Blues" (Doctor Clayton) – 5:02
"It Ain't Your Business" (James Moore) – 3:50
"Good Time Woman" (Johnny Winter) – 6:03
"Unseen Eye" (Sonny Boy Williamson II) – 4:18
"My Time After Awhile" (Bob Geddins)  6:13
"Serious as a Heart Attack" (Johnny Winter) – 3:31
"Give It Back" (Sonny Thompson) – 3:48
"Route 90" (Clarence Garlow, Leon René) – 4:07

Personnel
Musicians
Johnny Winter – guitar, vocals
Ken Saydak – piano
Johnny B. Gayden – bass
Casey Jones – drums
Jon Paris – harmonica on "Murdering Blues", "Good Time Woman", "Unseen Eye", "Give It Back"
Production
Johnny Winter, Bruce Iglauer, Dick Shurman – producers
Justin Niebank – engineering, mixing
Fred Breitberg – engineering for "Murdering Blues", "Unseen Eye"
Chris Garland – design
Ebet Roberts, Terrence Bert – photography
Greg Calbi – mastering
Recorded at Streeterville Studios in Chicago, Illinois and at Red Label Studios in Winnetka, Illinois

References

Johnny Winter albums
1985 albums
Albums produced by Bruce Iglauer
Albums produced by Johnny Winter
Alligator Records albums